Modiúit was an early successor of Saint Kerrill, Bishop of the kingdom of Soghain in what is now County Galway.

Modiúit established a church at what is now Killamude, in the parish of Ballymacward. Killamude derives from Cill Modiúit ('the church of Modiúit'). Its foundations can still be seen in the townland of Killamude West. His feast day was celebrated on 12 February, and is listed as such in the Martyrology of Tallaght and the Félire Óengusso. His diocese is thought to have been the extent of the Soghain kingdom.

Sources
Mannion, Joseph (2004). The Life, Legends and Legacy of Saint Kerrill: A Fifth-Century East Galway Evangelist. .

Medieval Irish saints
People from County Galway
6th-century Irish bishops